Radio Suno  is a Malayalam language radio station in Qatar. The FM station broadcasts 24/7 entertainment, songs and public awareness information.

Information 

Radio Suno is the first Malayalam FM radio station to be aired from the State of Qatar. The station serves diaspora from the Indian subcontinent. Radio Suno is one with two stations in the Olive Suno Radio Network, along with Radio Olive.

Programming

Radio Suno 91.7 has its own unique program structure across Qatar with station wise programming and which includes regional wise contents and flavours of particular regions.

References

External links
 

Radio stations in Qatar
Radio stations established in 2015